Helen Wynfreda Fisher (born 1942) is a New Zealand composer and music teacher.

Life
Helen Fisher grew up in Māpua, Nelson, and attended secondary school in Wellington. She graduated from the University of Canterbury in 1964 with a degree in English and taught English, music and French in New Zealand and Canadian secondary schools. She married and raised three daughters, but continued her studies in music at Victoria University of Wellington with Ross Harris, David Farquhar and Jack Body. In 1987 she won first prize in the Victoria University's Composers' Competition with Woodwind Trio and in 1989  won second prize for Pounamu.

She graduated in composition in 1991 and began working as a composer. Her compositions have been performed internationally. In 1990 and 1991, Fisher held the Arts Council residency of Composer-in-Schools in the Wellington area. In 1993, she co-founded the first New Zealand Composing Women's Festival.

Works
Fisher's compositions often blend Maori and European traditions. She composes for vocal and instrumental ensembles and also for dance theatre. Selected works include:

Te Tangi A Te Matui (1986)
Woodwind trio (1987)
Pounamu (1989) for SSAATB choir, alto soloist and koauau
Taku Wana (1998) for two mezzo-sopranos, Kai-karanga, taonga puoro (traditional Maori instruments), flute/piccolo, bodhran, string quartet
Tete Kura (2000)
Otari (2005) for solo harp
Bone of Contention, dance work for mezzo-soprano and ensemble	
Ko Wharepapa Te Maunga for brass octet	
Matairangi-1 for cello and piano	
Matairangi-2 for flute, viola and harp	
Muriranga-whenua for two flutes	
Nga Taniwha bicultural work for dance and school instrumentalists	
Nga Tapuwae o Kupe (The Footprints of Kupe) for school choir, instruments and dance	
String Quartet

Her music has been recorded and issued on CD, including:
Matairangi – Helen Fisher Chamber Music
Taku Wana – The Enduring Spirit, Atoll

References

1942 births
Living people
20th-century classical composers
New Zealand music teachers
Women classical composers
New Zealand classical composers
People from the Tasman District
University of Canterbury alumni
Victoria University of Wellington alumni
Women music educators
20th-century women composers